The Redgranite Correctional Institution is a medium security adult male correctional institution located in Redgranite, Wisconsin, in the United States.  

The prison is operated by the Wisconsin Department of Corrections. Groundbreaking occurred on June 18, 1999, and it opened on January 8, 2001.  Boldt Construction Company built it for the state at a cost of $52.9 million. The prison encompasses 89 acres of land, 22 acres of which are within the perimeter.

Demographics 
The operating capacity of the prison is 990. As of June 30, 2022, the prison held 980 prisoners.

References

External links
Redgranite Correctional Institution from the Wisconsin Department of Corrections

Prisons in Wisconsin
Buildings and structures in Waushara County, Wisconsin
2001 establishments in Wisconsin